Aloïs De Beule (27 August 1861 in Zele – 15 December 1935 in Ghent) was a Belgian sculptor.

Biography

Aged ten he entered his father's shoemaking business. He studied at the Royal Academy of Fine Arts and the Sint-Lucasschool in Ghent where he won the first prize in sculpture in 1888. In 1889 he and his brother Emile De Beule set up a studio together. They began in a barn in the Sint-Pietersdorp (Sint-Pieters-Aalst) district of Ghent, on the spot where Het Ros Beiaard stands - he produced that sculpture for the World Exhibition of 1913 in Ghent, in collaboration with Domien Ingels, an animal sculptor, and it proved a breakthrough for both of them. De Beule was also later commissioned by the architects Jean-Baptiste Bethune and Valentin Vaerwyck. His pupils included Geo Verbanck, Leo Sarteel, Oscar Sinia, Jules Vits and Modeste Van Hecke

Works
 The monument to the Peasants' War in the church square in Overmere
 Ros Beiaard
 Bronze statue of Adriaan Poirters in Oisterwijk
 Stations of the Cross for (among others) the Sint-Jacobskerk in Ghent, the Sint-Quintinuskerk in Zonhoven, the Church of the Annunciation in London, St Anne's Church in Liverpool and St Augustine's Church in Ramsgate
 Gilded statue of St Gudule in the Cathedral of St Michael and St Gudule, Brussels, 1912
 Statue of the Sacred Heart in the Emmaplein in 's-Hertogenbosch
 Busts of (among others) Antoon Stillemans, Hendrik Conscience and Prudens Van Duyse
 Monument to the fallen in the town park in Ruiselede, 1923
 Crucifix and Calvary in the pilgrimage route in Bareldonk Berlare
 Bronze statue of Christ the King in the church in Ophasselt, near Geraardsbergen

Gallery

References

External links

Biography of De Beule
De Beule's entry in the ODIS-databank

Belgian sculptors
1861 births
1935 deaths
People from Zele